Nasty Nasty is the third studio album by the American glam metal band Black 'n Blue. It was produced by Kiss bassist Gene Simmons, with the exception of the song "I'll Be There for You" which was written and produced by The Babys/Bad English/Journey rhythm guitarist/keyboardist Jonathan Cain.

Background
The title track is the basis of the Kiss song "Domino", and also contains the ending riff from "Only You", both Kiss songs credited to Simmons. Coincidentally, guitarist Tommy Thayer would join Kiss in 2002.

Nasty Nasty saw the band move away from the more polished approach of Without Love as it did not appeal to their metal fans. As a result, the production is much more raw and the album has a much more aggressive feel than Without Love, as the band sticks with hard rockers with the exception of "I'll Be There for You."

I'll Be There for You
The band had originally intended a song titled, "Promise the Moon" to be on the album, but it was replaced by "I'll Be There for You" because the record company thought that nothing could be pulled as a single. However, keyboard credits were given in the cassette and on the back of the LP to John Purdell for "Promise the Moon" and "Kiss of Death." Fans were baffled by this until liner notes in the 2003 re-master explained it.

Kiss of Death
At the end of "Kiss of Death", a different melody begins, the music is played forward, but Jaime's voice is heard singing backwards as a result to the backmask controversy.  When played reverse, it deciphers, "Baby, don't touch me anymore, don't touch me, you sick little bitch, I don't like this from you anymore, anymore, yeah, yeah, yeah, don't touch me, baby, get away from me, get away from me, you're just too sick for my--".

Track listing
Side one
 "Nasty Nasty" (Gene Simmons, Jaime St. James, Tommy Thayer) – 4:29
 "I Want It All (I Want It Now)" (Simmons, St. James, Thayer) – 4:25
 "Does She or Doesn't She" (St. James, Simmons, Thayer) – 4:18
 "Kiss of Death" (St. James, Thayer, Jeff Warner, Patrick Young, Pete Holmes) – 5:04

Side two
"12 O'Clock High" (St. James, Thayer, Warner, Young, Holmes) – 3:41
 "Do What You Wanna Do" (St. James, Thayer, Warner, Young, Holmes) – 4:14
 "I'll Be There for You" (Jonathan Cain) – 3:47
 "Rules" (St. James, Warner) – 3:40
 "Best in the West" (St. James, Thayer, Warner, Young, Holmes) – 4:47

Personnel
Black 'n Blue
 Jaime St. James – lead and backing vocals
 Tommy Thayer – lead guitar, backing vocals
 Jeff Warner – rhythm guitar
 Patrick Young – bass
 Pete Holmes – drums

Additional musicians
 John Purdell – keyboards on "Kiss of Death"
 Peter Criss, Ron Keel – vocals on "Best in the West"
 Marc Ferrari – guitar on "Best in the West"

Production
Gene Simmons – producer
Jonathan Cain – producer on track 7
Mickey Davis, Duane Baron – engineers 
Larry Hinds – engineer on track 7
Val Garay – mixing at Record One and One on One Recording Studios, Hollywood, California
Stephen Marcussen – mastering at Precision Lacquer, Hollywood, California
John Kalodner – A&R

References

Black 'n Blue albums
1986 albums
Albums produced by Gene Simmons
Albums produced by Jonathan Cain
Geffen Records albums